"My Truck" is the debut single by American musician Breland from his self-titled debut EP Breland (2020). It was first released independently in September 2019, and released by Bad Realm and Atlantic Records in January 2020  serving as the EP's lead single. The song entered the Hot Country Songs chart at number 46 in February 2020, and later peaked at number 26 in April 2020.

"My Truck" has been certified platinum by the Recording Industry Association of America (RIAA).

Remix
A remix, featuring country music artist Sam Hunt, was released on April 25, 2020.

Chart performance

Weekly charts

Year-end charts

Certifications

References

External links
Lyrics for this song at Genius

2019 songs
2019 debut singles
2020 singles
Atlantic Records singles
Songs written by Troy Taylor (record producer)
Songs written by Breland (musician)
Breland (musician) songs